The 1977–78 Honduran Liga Nacional season was the 12th edition of the Honduran Liga Nacional.  The format of the tournament consisted of a three round-robin schedule followed by a 5-team playoff round.  Club Deportivo Olimpia won the title after defeating Real C.D. España in the finals.  It's unclear why no Honduran representation was sent to the 1978 CONCACAF Champions' Cup.

1977–78 teams

 Broncos (Choluteca)
 Federal (Tegucigalpa)
 Marathón (San Pedro Sula)
 Motagua (Tegucigalpa)
 Olimpia (Tegucigalpa)
 Platense (Puerto Cortés)
 Real España (San Pedro Sula)
 Universidad (Tegucigalpa)
 Victoria (La Ceiba, promoted)
 Vida (La Ceiba)

Regular season

Standings

Reply for Final round

Final round

Pentagonal standings

Final

 Olimpia won 2–0 on aggregate score.

Top goalscorers
 10 goals:
  Mario Juvini Carreño (Motagua)
 8 goals:
  Prudencio Norales (Olimpia)
 7 goals:
  Jurandir Dosantos (Marathón)
 6 goals:
  Armando Valenchina (Vida)
  Daniel Sambulá (Universidad)
  Mario Mairena (Federal)
  Salvador Bernárdez (Motagua)
  Luis Walter Chávez (Olimpia)

Squads

Known results

Round 1

Round 2

Round 3

Round 4

Round 5

Round 17

Round 18

Round 27

Pentagonal

Unknown rounds

References

Liga Nacional de Fútbol Profesional de Honduras seasons
1
Honduras